Metamulciber is a genus of longhorn beetles of the subfamily Lamiinae, containing the following species:

 Metamulciber albostriatus Breuning, 1940
 Metamulciber geometricus Breuning,
 Metamulciber ochreolineatus Breuning, 1947
 Metamulciber ziczac Breuning, 1947

References

Homonoeini